The 1980 IMSA GT Series season was the 10th season of the IMSA GT Championship auto racing series.  It was a series for GTX class Group 5 cars and GTO and GTU class grand tourer cars.  It began February 2, 1980, and ended November 30, 1980, after fourteen rounds.

Schedule
Not all classes participated in shorter events.  Races marked with All had all classes on track at the same time.

Season results

External links
 World Sports Racing Prototypes - 1980 IMSA GT Championship results

IMSA GT Championship seasons
IMSA GT